John Boyd (1789 – 2 January 1862) was an Irish politician. He was elected as a Member of Parliament (MP) for Coleraine in 1843, and resigned on 16 March 1852 through appointment as Steward of the Chiltern Hundreds. He was again elected for the same constituency in 1857, but died in office on 2 January 1862.

References

External links 

1789 births
1862 deaths
UK MPs 1841–1847
UK MPs 1847–1852
UK MPs 1857–1859
UK MPs 1859–1865
Members of the Parliament of the United Kingdom for County Londonderry constituencies (1801–1922)